NFC stands for Near-field communication.

Feature phones

Smartphones

A-H

I-P

Q-Z

Tablet computers

Smartwatches

Apple Watch 
All Apple Watch versions, including from the original launched in 2015, are NFC-capable and support Apple Pay.

List of NFC-enabled WearOS devices
Some WearOS smartwatches have NFC capabilities for pay-and-go contactless payments via Google Pay.

Video game controllers 

On 27 January 2012, Nintendo President Satoru Iwata announced in a briefing that the controller of the Wii U home console will have an installable NFC function. By installing this functionality, it will become possible to create cards and figurines that can electronically read and write data via noncontact NFC and to expand the new play format in the video game world. Adoption of this functionality will enable various other possibilities such as using it as a means of making micropayments.

xiaomi android tablet 
List of 3D-enabled mobile phones
Projector phone

References 

Near-field communication
NFC-enabled mobile devices